The Pandan Strait is a strait south of Singapore's main island. It separates the man-made Jurong Island from the Southern Islands. The strait was partially affected by the Natuna Sea oil spill in October 2000.

See also
Singapore Strait

References

Geography of Singapore
Straits of Singapore
Western Islands Planning Area